Michael Foster (born 1973) is an Australian writer of science fiction and fantasy. He was awarded a commendation for The Young Magician in the 2008 Australian Literary Awards.

Bibliography
 The Young Magician, The Legacy Trilogy - Book One.  Perth, Australia: Michael Foster, 2008.  .  Review: "The story left me breathless...I highly recommend this page-turner...riveting"
 She Who Has No Name, The Legacy Trilogy - Book Two.  Perth, Australia: Michael Foster, 2009.  .  Review: "...a self-contained take that leaves [the] audience fully committed and surprised at every turn."

References

External links
 michaelfosterbooks.com

1973 births
Australian science fiction writers
Living people